Ferdinando and Carolina is a 1999 Italian historical comedy film directed by Lina Wertmüller.

Cast 

Sergio Assisi as Ferdinand I of the Two Sicilies
Gabriella Pession as  Maria Carolina of Austria
Nicole Grimaudo as  Princess of Medina
Adriano Pantaleo as Young Ferdinand I 
Mario Scaccia as  Old Ferdinand I 
Lola Pagnani as Sara Goudar
Carlo Caprioli as  Joseph II
Moira Grassi as  Countess of San Marco
Lucilla Vacondìo as  Lady Stratfordshire
Leo Benvenuti as  Bernardo Tanucci
Isa Danieli as Fravulella 
Silvana De Santis as  Maria Theresa
Gianni Bonagura as the Austrian Ambassador

References

External links

1999 films
1999 comedy films
Italian comedy films
Films directed by Lina Wertmüller
1990s Italian films